Gerhard Ammerer (born 11 September 1956) is an Austrian historian and professor at the University of Salzburg.

Career 
Born in Salzburg, Ammerer studied history and German language and literature at the universities of Salzburg and Innsbruck from 1975 to 1981.

Between 1981 and 1985 he was a contract assistant at the Institute for History at the University of Salzburg and completed studies in history, dissertation and law. He completed both studies with a doctorate.

From 1985 he was a university assistant, from 1996 assistant professor.

In 2000 he habilitated at the Faculty of Humanities of the Paris-London-University Salzburg for the subject "Austrian History". In 2001 he was appointed ao.Univ.-Prof.

Publications 
 
 
 
 
 
 

 
 "Giuseppe Tomaselli 1758–1836. Eine biographische Skizze des Salzburger Hoftenors uns Gesangspädagogen aus Anlass seines 250. Geburtstags". In: Mitteilungen der Gesellschaft für Salzburger Landeskunde, vol. 148 (2008),

References

External links 
 
 Page at the Salzburg University

1956 births
Living people
Academic staff of the University of Salzburg
20th-century Austrian historians
21st-century Austrian historians